Pedrovo is a settlement in the Municipality of Nova Gorica, western Slovenia. It was established in 2011. Previously, it was part of the settlement of Branik.

Church

The church in Pedrovo is dedicated to the Holy Spirit and belongs to the Diocese of Koper.

References

External links
 
 Pedrovo on Geopedia

Populated places in the City Municipality of Nova Gorica